Lipangui Airport ,  is an airport  south-southeast of Lampa, a city in the Santiago Metropolitan Region of Chile.

See also

Transport in Chile
List of airports in Chile

References

External links
OpenStreetMap - Lipangui
OurAirports - Lipangui
SkyVector - Lipangui

Airports in Santiago Metropolitan Region